Jai Pratap Singh is an Indian politician serving as the Minister of Medical and Health, Family Welfare, Mother and Child Welfare in the Yogi Adityanath ministry of the Uttar Pradesh Government. He is a member of 17th Legislative Assembly of Uttar Pradesh and was a member of 10th, 11th, 12th, 13th, 14th and 16th Legislative Assemblies of Uttar Pradesh. He is a member of Bharatiya Janta Party. He was elected to Uttar Pradesh Legislative Assembly seven times from Bansi constituency of Siddharthnagar district.

Personal life
Singh was born on 7 September 1953 to Raja Rudra Pratap Singh in Dumraon, Bihar. He completed his Higher Secondary studies from Mayo College, Ajmer in 1970 and graduated with Bachelor of Arts (Honours) from KC College, Bombay in 1974. Singh married Basundhara Kumari on 19 January 1983, with whom he has two sons. He is a farmer by profession and is a resident of Rajmahal, Bansi, Siddharthnagar district.

Political career
Jai Pratap Singh has been a MLA seven straight times. Since 1989, he represented the  Bansi (Assembly constituency) as  a member of the  Bhartiya Janata Party.

In Seventeenth Legislative Assembly of Uttar Pradesh (2017)  elections, he defeated his nearest rival  Samajwadi Party candidate Lal Ji by a margin of 18,942 votes. After winning for seventh time, he was appointed Cabinet minister of Excise and Liquor Prohibition in Government of Uttar Pradesh.

On 21 August 2019, After first cabinet expansion of Yogi Adityanath his ministry department changed as Minister of Medical and Health, Family Welfare, Mother and Child Welfare.

Posts held

References 

Bharatiya Janata Party politicians from Uttar Pradesh
Uttar Pradesh MLAs 2017–2022
Living people
Yogi ministry
State cabinet ministers of Uttar Pradesh
People from Siddharthnagar district
1953 births
Uttar Pradesh MLAs 2022–2027